Méré may refer to:

 Méré, Yvelines, France
 Méré, Yonne, France
 Antoine Gombaud, Chevalier de Méré (1607 – 1684), French writer.

See also 
 Meré, Spain
 Mere (disambiguation)